Antwain Britt (born May 9, 1978) is an American professional mixed martial artist who last competed in Strikeforce's Middleweight division. While perhaps best known for his stint with the Strikeforce organization, he also fought in YAMMA Pit Fighting, and was a contestant on The Ultimate Fighter 8.

Background
Britt was born and raised in the Hampton Roads of Virginia, but also lived in Baltimore, Maryland. He attended Indian River High School in Chesapeake, Virginia where he was an All-State football player and wrestler and then continued his wrestling career at Old Dominion University. After college, Britt was out of shape and began training in mixed martial arts as a way to lose weight.

Mixed martial arts career

Early career
He made his debut in the Heavyweight division but after a few fights dropped to Light Heavyweight. He was a contestant on The Ultimate Fighter 8, winning by majority decision over Ryan Jimmo, but was replaced by Eliot Marshall due to sustaining a broken hand in the fight. After beating UFC veteran Antonio Mendes at Shine Fights 1: Genesis, Antwain took part in VFC: A Night Of Vengeance grand prix tournament. He beat another UFC veteran in Carmelo Marrero, and also beat Rich Hale but in the finals he lost to Rodney Wallace.

Strikeforce
Britt signed with Strikeforce in September 2009. He currently trains with Carlson Gracie black belt Carlos Carvahlo. His Strikeforce debut came against Scott Lighty which Britt won by TKO.

Britt next fight came against Rafael Cavalcante. The winner of the bout between Britt-Cavalcante will become the number one contender to the Strikeforce Light Heavyweight Championship against Muhammed Lawal. Britt lost via KO (punches) at Strikeforce: Heavy Artillery.

His next fight was to come against Ovince St. Preux at Strikeforce Challengers: Wilcox vs. Ribeiro. Britt lost by unanimous decision. On November 18, 2011, Britt made his Middleweight debut as the headliner for Strikeforce Challengers: Britt vs. Sayers. Britt lost this fight by KO 28 seconds into the first round. This was Britt's third loss in a row and only the second time in his career that he had been knocked out.

Mixed martial arts record

|-
| Loss
| align=center| 11–6
| Lumumba Sayers
| KO (punches)
| Strikeforce Challengers: Britt vs. Sayers
| 
| align=center| 1
| align=center| 0:28
| Las Vegas, Nevada, United States
| 
|-
| Loss
| align=center| 11–5
| Ovince St. Preux
| Decision (unanimous)
| Strikeforce Challengers: Wilcox vs. Ribeiro
| 
| align=center| 3
| align=center| 5:00
| Jackson, Mississippi, United States
| 
|-
| Loss
| align=center| 11–4
| Rafael Cavalcante
| KO (punches)
| Strikeforce: Heavy Artillery
| 
| align=center| 1
| align=center| 3:45
| St. Louis, Missouri, United States
| 
|-
| Win
| align=center| 11–3
| Scott Lighty
| TKO (doctor stoppage)
| Strikeforce: Evolution
| 
| align=center| 1
| align=center| 5:00
| San Jose, California, United States
| 
|-
| Loss
| align=center| 10–3
| Rodney Wallace
| Submission (armbar)
| VFC: A Night Of Vengeance
| 
| align=center| 1
| align=center| 3:59
| Oranjestad, Aruba
| 
|-
| Win
| align=center| 10–2
| Rich Hale
| Decision (majority)
| VFC: A Night Of Vengeance
| 
| align=center| 2
| align=center| 5:00
| Oranjestad, Aruba
| 
|-
| Win
| align=center| 9–2
| Carmelo Marrero
| Decision (unanimous)
| VFC: A Night Of Vengeance
| 
| align=center| 2
| align=center| 5:00
| Oranjestad, Aruba
| 
|-
| Win
| align=center| 8–2
| Antonio Mendes
| TKO (punches)
| Shine Fights 1: Genesis
| 
| align=center| 1
| align=center| 0:08
| Columbus, Ohio, United States
| 
|-
| Loss
| align=center| 7–2
| Jamal Patterson
| Submission (guillotine choke)
| UWC 5: Man O' War
| 
| align=center| 1
| align=center| 0:44
| Fairfax, Virginia, United States
| 
|-
| Win
| align=center| 7–1
| Robert Turner
| TKO (punches)
| Cagefest Xtreme: Evolution
| 
| align=center| 2
| 
| Norfolk, Virginia, United States
| 
|-
| Win
| align=center| 6–1
| Terry Cohens
| TKO (punches)
| UWC 4: Confrontation
| 
| align=center| 1
| align=center| 0:31
| Fairfax, Virginia, United States
| 
|-
| Win
| align=center| 5–1
| Wayne Cole
| TKO
| C3 Fights: Showdown 2
| 
| align=center| 1
| align=center| 0:51
| Cherokee, North Carolina, United States
|Light Heavyweight debut.
|-
| Loss
| align=center| 4–1
| Bryan Vetell
| Decision (unanimous)
| YAMMA Pit Fighting
| 
| align=center| 1
| align=center| 5:00
| Atlantic City, New Jersey, United States
| 
|-
| Win
| align=center| 4–0
| Isaiah Larson
| TKO
| Smash MMA
| 
| align=center| 1
| 
| Virginia, United States
| 
|-
| Win
| align=center| 3–0
| Sam Holloway
| KO
| Wild Bill's: Fight Night 12
| 
| align=center| 1
| align=center| 1:23
| Atlanta, Georgia, United States
| 
|-
| Win
| align=center| 2–0
| Patrick Barrantine
| KO (punches)
| MMAC: The Revolution
| 
| align=center| 1
| align=center| 1:12
| Washington, D.C., United States
| 
|-
| Win
| align=center| 1–0
| Soloman Sands
| KO (punches)
| Combat Sports Challenge
| 
| align=center| 1
| align=center| 0:43
| Virginia, United States
|

Professional boxing record

References

External links

American male mixed martial artists
African-American mixed martial artists
Mixed martial artists from Virginia
Light heavyweight mixed martial artists
Mixed martial artists utilizing boxing
Mixed martial artists utilizing collegiate wrestling
American male boxers
African-American boxers
Boxers from Virginia
Heavyweight boxers
American male sport wrestlers
African-American sport wrestlers
Amateur wrestlers
Old Dominion Monarchs athletes
Sportspeople from Chesapeake, Virginia
Living people
1978 births
21st-century African-American sportspeople
20th-century African-American sportspeople